Nefrubity was an ancient Egyptian princess of the 18th Dynasty. She was the daughter of Pharaoh Thutmose I and Ahmose, the sister of Hatshepsut and the half-sister of Thutmose II, Wadjmose and Amenmose.

She is depicted with her parents in Hatshepsut's Deir el-Bahari mortuary temple, then vanishes. It is assumed that she died young.

Sources

Princesses of the Eighteenth Dynasty of Egypt
16th-century BC Egyptian women
15th-century BC Egyptian women
Children of Thutmose I